Zork: Grand Inquisitor is a graphic adventure game developed and published by Activision, and released for Windows in 1997; a second edition for Macintosh was released in 2001. The game is the twelfth in the Zork series, and builds upon both this and the Enchanter series of interactive fiction video games originally released by Infocom. The game's story focuses on the efforts of a salesperson who becomes involved in restoring magic to Zork while thwarting the plots of a tyrannical figure seeking to stop this. The game features the performances of Erick Avari, Michael McKean, Amy D. Jacobson, Marty Ingels, Earl Boen, Jordana Capra, Dirk Benedict, David Lander and Rip Taylor.

The game was a modest commercial success and received generally favorable reviews, many praising the game for returning to the roots of the series following Zork Nemesis. A promotional prequel titled Zork: The Undiscovered Underground was released with the game, written by one of the original creators of the series, alongside a poster portraying the chronology of the series.

Gameplay
Zork: Grand Inquisitor is conducted from a first-person perspective within each of the game's pre-rendered locations (dubbed "Z-Vision"), which allows full exploration of the majority of locations with a 360 degree view; in other locations the view is fixed, while some sites allow the view to look above and below their position. Like Zork Nemesis, players use their cursor to interact with the environment, including examining items, picking up and using objects and moving between locations. At times, the player will also assume the role of one of three supporting characters to explore additional locations. If the player conducts an action or mistake that is fatal, the game cuts to a computer terminal on which the player's fatal action and its consequences appear in prose form, much in the fashion of the original Zork trilogy, complete with a score and the player's rank.

The inventory system allows players to examine items they collect, as well as making use of spells to solve puzzles - many of those found are maintained in a spellbook, while others are single use, with several originating from the Zork and Enchanter games. Quick-use menus for spells and inventory items are also available for use by the player to find what they need.

Story

Setting
The game takes place within the world of Zork, within the kingdom of Quendor and the Great Underground Empire, and is set 120 years after the events of Zork Nemesis (and contains small references to it), but before the events of Return to Zork. 100 years before the game begins, magic fell and disappears from Zork, leading to an advancement in technology. Leading this advancement is the Inquisition - a powerful group that establishes order and laws in Quendor, seeking to find and eliminate any remaining vestiges of magic. Any violation of the rules set out by the Inquisition, no matter how trivial, automatically leads to "totemization" - a process developed as an alternative to the death penalty, in which a person (or animal) is put through a machine called a Totemizer, whereby they are imprisoned within a steel can called a "totem" for eternity.

By the start of the game, the Inquisition is in full control of the land, recently "liberating" the town of Port Foozle, and is prepared to make plans to eliminate the rest of the magic in the land. Players take on the role of a salesperson for the Frobozz Electric Company (formerly the Frobozz Magic Company), who arrives as the town enters a curfew. Like most Zork games, Grand Inquisitor employs humour in its adventure, and makes frequent use of parody, containing numerous references to staples and clichés of the traditional adventure genre.

Characters
"AFGNCAAP" - A Frobozz Electric "PermaSuck" vacuum cleaner salesperson who arrives in Port Foozle just as it enters curfew. Their name, given by Dalboz, is the abbreviation of "Ageless, Faceless, Gender-Neutral, Culturally Ambiguous Adventure Person".
 Dalboz of Gurth (voiced by Michael McKean) - The former Dungeon Master of the Underground, who acts as the player's guide through much of the game after having their spirit trapped in a lantern by Yannick.
 Mir Yannick (portrayed by Erick Avari) - Head of the Inquisition under the title of "The Grand Inquisitor", and the story's antagonist. A former magic student who favors technology over magic.
 Y'Gael (portrayed by Jordana Capra) - The Lost Enchantress of the Empire, who desires to see magic return and the fall of the Inquisition. Provides aid to the player when needed.
 Antharia Jack (portrayed by Dirk Benedict) - A famous actor and adventurer, who unwittingly impedes and aids the player.
 Brog (voiced by Earl Boen) - A member of a small, troll-like species, who love eating rocks and are strong, but also lack intelligence, who unwittingly   himself when trying to hide from the Inquisition.

Plot
The Inquisition liberates Port Foozle from magic and closes the Underground. That evening as a curfew is about to begin, the player character, a salesperson for the Frobozz Electric Company, arrives in Port Foozle and notices a strange glow coming from the docks. Investigating it, the player finds a lantern and takes it to a local pawn shop owned by Antharia Jack, a famous adventurer of the Underground, who offers to look into it, only for him to confiscate the lantern when it's discovered to have magic within it. After framing Jack for arson to get the lantern back, the player character finds it contains the imprisoned soul of the Dungeon Master, Dalboz of Gurth, who urges the player character to enter the Underground where they can talk safely. Once there, Dalboz asks the player to help restore magic to the world, and stop The Grand Inquisitor, Mir Yannick, from purging it and taking control with a world of technology.

Aided by Lost Enchantress, Y'Gael, in the form of a spellbook, the player journeys across the underground, acquiring various spells, and soon learns that Yannick was a failed student of magic, which explains his reasons for wanting magic to be gone. Along the way, they also listen to a message left behind by the Wizard, Belboz, in the G.U.E. Tech university, revealing that three artifacts are needed to restore magic to Zork: the Cube of Foundation (representing Middle Magic), the Coconut of Quendor (representing High Magic), and the Skull of Yoruk (representing Deep Magic). All three were lost in time in specific locations, and the only way to reach them is travel to their location via time tunnels situated around the underground. Because doing so in person would be fatal, the player instead uses the   spirits of three magical beings - Griff, a cowardly, small dragon, Brog, a dim-witted but strong, small troll-like creature, and Lucy Flathead, a mind-reader and former magic resistance member - to retrieve the artifacts, with each getting their hands on a specific one in the past, and storing them in a Living Castle that Dalboz had been raising and which the player charms with magic. During her trip to Foozle's past, Lucy grows attached to Antharia Jack, who in turn falls in love with her but curses his luck when she is forced to leave the past.

Yannick captures them after the third artifact is found, to stop them interfering in his plans and quell any further action by magic resistance members. Thrown into jail at Port Foozle, Jack regrets what he did and decides to help the player, supplying a scroll to escape with, before the player helps him break out and recover their items. The pair escape from jail with the help of the Living Castle, which takes them to Flathead Mesa.

Once there, the player is told by Y'Gael to place the artifacts in specific levels of a radio tower situated on the Mesa. During this time, Yannick unveils a "radical new mind-numbing" piece of technology, called "Inquizivision" - a 500-channel, 24-hour TV network - which will secretly allow him to brainwash all of Quendor and cement his power. Yannick spots the player on the tower along with the coconut and tries to grab it. However, the player prevents this by casting a spell that fuses the three levels of magic stored in the artifacts. The resulting blast from the spell restores magic to the world of Zork, frees the  spirits from their imprisonment, erases all Inquisition posters, and sends Yannick falling to his death. The player is also knocked from the tower by the blast, but is rescued by Griff.

Now freed, Lucy shares an intimate moment with Jack, kissing him, before taking her rightful place as Queen of Quendor and announcing to the people of Foozle of the victory over the Inquisition, the restoration of magic to all, and the re-opening of the Underground. The game ends with Lucy naming the player as Dalboz's successor, and making them the new Dungeon Master, whilst making her second act to be an explanation to Jack about time travel.

Development
Zork: Grand Inquisitor was announced on January 22, 1997, with a release date set for fall of that year. It was developed on an enhanced version of the Zork Nemesis game engine. In something of a return to the series' roots, the game in rough form was written in Inform (a programming language for text adventures) before work started on the graphics, while Marc Blank, part of the original Zork team, was commissioned to create an original text adventure game, Zork: The Undiscovered Underground, to be included as a free promotion for Grand Inquisitor.

The music for the game was composed by John Everett Beal and Mark Morgan, while the game's design was handled by Margaret Stohl. The Macintosh port was developed by MacPlay. Zork: Grand Inquisitor was one of the first computer games to include true closed captioning so that the hearing impaired could play without missing any of the sound effects and spoken dialog in the game. The original release included a feelie poster with a timeline of the history of Zork up until the events of the game, with pictures and short descriptions of major events, including the backstory of some of the characters; this encompasses all released Zork games except Return to Zork, which takes place 580 years after Zork: Grand Inquisitor.

Reception

According to Matt Barton of Gamasutra, "Zork: Grand Inquisitor did not sell as many copies as Activision hoped." The game received "average" reviews according to the review aggregation website GameRankings.

GameSpot said, "Compact and unspectacular as it is, Zork: Grand Inquisitor is a model of adventure gaming as good entertainment. Many of the genre's conventions (FMV, item hunting, absurdist humor) get polished to a high sheen here. It is funny and reflexive without being geeky or pointlessly ironic. The third-string actors exploit their comic trademarks to good effect. Real attention is paid to the pacing of the whole affair, so there are no overly quiet dead zones of tedious activity. And the puzzles are fun to solve rather than gratuitous brain-teasing exercises." Adventure Classic Gaming said, "One of the more distinguished, entertaining games of the last several years, Zork Grand Inquisitor is light and amusing (and in some places, very funny). It strikes a good balance between its tone and subject matter. [...] Overall, Zork Grand Inquisitor is the best looking game among the next generation titles of the Zork series. While it is a very good adventure, it is not a very good Zork." Destructoid wrote an article about it in the site's Games Time Forgot series, commenting "Not only is Zork: Grand Inquisitor a clever, well-written adventure game, but it's also one of the most singularly rewarding games a fan of Zork could ever play."

Next Generation stated that "Overall, Inquisitor is definitely a step up for the series and puts Zork back on the right track after a serious stumble with Nemesis. Hopefully, this will continue. Well done." A brief review in GamePro commented, "The graphics look gorgeous (unless they're animated), plus there are plenty of inside jokes and a good sense of self-mocking humor, delivered crisply by Tinseltown talent. The interface is a dream, and believe it or not, the game supports multiplayer for joint brain power."

Zork: Grand Inquisitor was a runner-up for Computer Gaming Worlds 1997 "Adventure Game of the Year" award, which ultimately went to The Curse of Monkey Island. The editors called Grand Inquisitor "a wonderful return to form, with the best humor this side of Monkey Island." Similarly, the Computer Game Developers Conference nominated Grand Inquisitor for its 1998 "Best Adventure/RPG" Spotlight Award, but this went ultimately to Final Fantasy VII. It was also nominated for "Most Innovative Game Design", but lost to PaRappa the Rapper.

Legacy
Two sequels to Zork: Grand Inquisitor were announced in August 1997. According to the staff of PC Gamer US, the games would "continue the adventure and round out the series as the final two installments in a new Zork adventure trilogy."

In 2011, Adventure Gamers named Grand Inquisitor the 12th-best adventure game ever released.

See also
The Space Bar

References

External links

Return to Hotel New Zork - Mirror of the Activision promotional mini site 'Hotel New Zork' (as archived at the Internet Archive)
Zork: Grand Inquisitor summary and review at Adventure Classic Gaming
Zork: Grand Inquisitor at The JAVE
How to install ZGI on Windows XP
How to install ZGI on Linux with Wine

1990s interactive fiction
1997 video games
Adventure games
Point-and-click adventure games
Activision games
First-person adventure games
Classic Mac OS games
ScummVM-supported games
Video games scored by Mark Morgan
Windows games
Zork
Video games developed in the United States